The 2013 AFC U-16 Women's Championship was the 5th edition of the tournament. The tournament was held from 26 September to 6 October 2013.

The tournament was played in Nanjing, China, just as the 2011 edition. The top three teams qualify for the 2014 FIFA U-17 Women's World Cup.

Qualification

Four teams were directly qualified by their 2011 performance, the others had to enter qualifying.

Format
The twelve teams are drawn into four groups of three teams. After playing each other once the group winner advances to the semi-finals. The draw was held on 26 April 2013.

If two or more teams are equal on points on completion of the group matches, the following criteria were applied to determine the rankings.
 Greater number of points obtained in the group matches between the teams concerned;
 Goal difference resulting from the group matches between the teams concerned;
 Greater number of goals scored in the group matches between the teams concerned;
 Goal difference in all the group matches;
 Greater number of goals scored in all the group matches;
 Kicks from the penalty mark if only two teams are involved and they are both on the field of play;
 Fewer score calculated according to the number of yellow and red cards received in the group matches;
 Drawing of lots.

Group stage
All kick-off times are China Standard time (UTC+08:00).

Group A

Group B

Group C

Group D

Knockout stage

Semifinals

Third place play-off

Final

Awards
The following awards were given.

Goalscorers
7 goals

 Rikako Kobayashi

6 goals

 Liu Yan
 Hikaru Kitagawa
 Hina Sugita
 Ri Hae-yon

4 goals

 Cui Yuhan
 Wu Yue
 Miho Kamogawa
 Sung Hyang-sim
 Sudarat Chuchuen

3 goals

 Sunny Franco
 Qin Manman
 Wi Jong-sim

2 goals

 Chen Yudan
 Fuka Kono
 Fuka Nagano
 Meika Nishida
 Narumi Miura
 Kim Pom-ui
 Lee So-hee

1 goals

 Afrikah Mcgladrigan
 Alexandra Chidiac
 Jessica Pitts
 Madeline Stockdale
 Rhianna Pollicina
 Fan Yuqiu
 Shen Lufan
 Fatemeh Geraeli
 Shabnam Behesht
 Manar Mohammad Mahmoud Isleem
 Moeka Minami
 Yukiko Abe
 Yurina Imai
 Wakaho Kanda
 An Song-ok
 Ju Hyo-sim

 Mun Kyong-yong
 Ri Pom-hwang
 Ri Un-yong
 Janthawan Thanakorn
 Jiraporn
 Sojirat
 Pan Shin-yu
 Yang Chia-hui

Own goal
 Hessa Alzayani (playing against China PR)

References

External links
 Official tournament website

Women's Championship
AFC U-16 Women's Championship
Afc
2013 in youth sport
2013 in youth association football
September 2013 sports events in China
October 2013 sports events in China